The Syrian Federation, officially the Federation of the Autonomous States of Syria, was constituted on 28 June 1922 by High Commissary Gouraud. It comprised the States of Aleppo, Damascus and of the Alawites, spanning an area of 119,000 to 120,000 km2. It was officially dissolved by decree of 5 December 1924, "which received its application starting from 1 January 1925".

History 
The Syrian Federation was founded on 28 June 1922 as a result of Decree 1459 from High Commissioner of the Levant Henri Gouraud. It comprised the states of Aleppo, Damascus and the Alawites, spanning an area of 119,000 to 120,000 km2. The federation's government consisted of the President of the Federation and the Federal Council, and initially alternated between sitting in Aleppo and Damascus. Homs was also considered as a potential capital city. The first session of the Federal Council opened in Aleppo on 28 June 1922 with a speech from Gouraud. On 8 January 1923, Damascus became the permanent seat of government, creating divisions in the country's political leadership. The Syrian Federation's only president was Subhi Bey Barakat, who claimed in his first three presidential decrees to have been elected by the Federal Council on 29 June 1922. However, according to Syrian historian and jurist Edmond Rabbath, Barakat was in fact "ineligible in the year following the end of his presidency" and therefore "appointed and not elected." Barakat was nevertheless formally elected president by the Federal Council on 17 December 1923. 

The Syrian Federation was officially dissolved by Decree 2980, which was issued on 5 December 1924 by High Commissioner Maxime Weygand and took effect on 1 January 1925. The decree merged the states of Aleppo and Damascus into the State of Syria and named Barakat president of the new country.

Government 
The President of the Federation was elected by an absolute majority of the Federal Council and held office for a term of one year. Afterwards, the president would be ineligible for re-election for one year following their departure from office. They exercised executive powers such as the preparation of the federal budget, the nomination of government officials and the negotiation of treaties with non-federated states, all subject to the ratification of the High Commissariat of the Levant. The Federal Council was a deliberative body composed of five representatives. It studied proposals leading to the adoption of legislation and dealt with economic affairs, such as public works.

References

Sources

 
 
 
 
 
 

1920s in Mandatory Syria
States and territories established in 1922
States and territories disestablished in 1925